The 1979 Plymouth City Council election took place on 3 May 1979 to elect members of Plymouth City Council in Devon, England. This was on the same day as other local elections. It was the first election to be held under new ward boundaries. The Conservative Party retained control of the council, which it had held since its creation in 1973.

Overall results

|-
| colspan=2 style="text-align: right; margin-right: 1em" | Total
| style="text-align: right;" | 60
| colspan=5 |
| style="text-align: right;" | 127,384
| style="text-align: right;" |

Ward results

Budshead (3 seats)

Compton (3 seats)

Drake (3 seats)

Efford (3 seats)

Eggbuckland (3 seats)

Estover (3 seats)

Ham (3 seats)

Honicknowle (3 seats)

Keyham (3 seats)

Mount Gould (3 seats)

Plympton Erle (3 seats)

Plympton St Mary (3 seats)

Plymstock Dunstone (3 seats)

Plymstock Radford (3 seats)

Southway (3 seats)

St Budeax (3 seats)

St Peter (3 seats)

Stoke (3 seats)

Sutton (3 seats)

Trelawny (3 seats)

References

1979 English local elections
May 1979 events in the United Kingdom
1979
1970s in Devon